Sándor Minder or Magyar (25 October 1907 — 17 May 1983) was a Hungarian ice hockey player. He played for the Hungarian national team at the 1928 and 1936 Winter Olympics and several World Championships.

References

External links
 

1907 births
1983 deaths
Hungarian ice hockey centres
Ice hockey players at the 1928 Winter Olympics
Ice hockey players at the 1936 Winter Olympics
Olympic ice hockey players of Hungary
Ice hockey people from Budapest
Hungarian emigrants to Switzerland